Gregory Frank Allen (born 18 October 1967) is an English former professional footballer who played as a midfielder in the Football League for Arsenal and Cambridge United, and in non-League football for Dagenham, Billericay Town and Dagenham & Redbridge.

References

1967 births
Living people
Footballers from West Ham
English footballers
Association football midfielders
Arsenal F.C. players
Dagenham F.C. players
Cambridge United F.C. players
Dagenham & Redbridge F.C. players
English Football League players
National League (English football) players